Chahar Meleh Gel Sorkheh (also Romanized as Chahār Meleh Gel Sorkheh; also known as Kol Sorkheh-ye Mīshākhvor and Gel Sorkheh) is a village in Dowreh Rural District, Chegeni District, Dowreh County, Lorestan Province, Iran. At the 2006 census, its population was 179, in 42 families.

References 

Towns and villages in Dowreh County